The Open Turn debate took place in 1991 within the Militant tendency of the British Labour Party. The debate was the result of disagreement over whether, in the changed political situation of the time, the organisation would best be able to win support for their form of Trotskyism (for them Marxism) amongst the working class as entryists within the Labour Party, or as an independent political party.

See also
Militant tendency#The Open Turn 
 Peter Taaffe#The Open Turn

References

1991 in politics
1991 in the United Kingdom
Socialism in the United Kingdom
Militant tendency